East Trenton is a neighborhood located within the city of Trenton in Mercer County, New Jersey, United States. It borders Hamilton Township and is home to a sizable African-American community, besides having small pockets of Latinos (mainly from Puerto Rico) and Italians.

Schools
Trenton Central High School, Trenton's primary public high school, is located in the neighborhood as well as the Trenton Train Station with Amtrak, NJ Transit, and SEPTA, service.

Notable people
 Troy Vincent (born 1970), Buffalo Bills free safety.

References

External links 
 Love Thy Neighbor Community Development Corporation

Neighborhoods in Trenton, New Jersey